Aryna Sabalenka was the defending champion, but she was ineligible to participate having qualified for 2018 WTA Elite Trophy.

Luksika Kumkhum won her first WTA 125K series title, defeating Irina Khromacheva in the final, 1–6, 6–2, 6–3.

Seeds

Draw

Finals

Top half

Bottom half

Qualifying

Seeds

Qualifiers

Lucky loser

Qualifying draw

First qualifier

Second qualifier

Third qualifier

Fourth qualifier

References

External links
Main Draw
Qualifying Draw

Mumbai Open
Sport in Mumbai
Tennis in India
2018 in Indian tennis